Vince Richard Ditrich (born April 4, 1963) is a Canadian rock musician, best known as the drummer and manager of the band Spirit of the West.

Early life
Ditrich grew up in Lethbridge, Alberta.  He began playing drums as a child, and performed in his father's local band as a teenager.

Career
Ditrich played drums with a variety of musicians, including pre-Odds bands with Doug Elliott and Steven Drake, Long John Baldry, and Paul Hyde. He went on tour in western Canada with Sue Medley in 1990, and also played with Mae Moore, Great Big Sea and Doug and the Slugs.

In late 1989, he joined Spirit of the West, and performed on their 1991 album Go Figure. He has been a member of that band ever since. In 2001 Ditrich became the band's manager as well. He has also continued to record with other musicians as a session drummer, and released a solo album in 2002.

Spirit of the West frequently performed a rendition of "That's Amore" in concert, with Ditrich on lead vocals. Except for a live recording of that song on the band's 1999 greatest hits compilation Hit Parade, however, Ditrich did not normally perform lead vocals on the band's albums.

In 2005 Ditrich took on a management role for the bluegrass band House of Doc.

In 2010 Ditrich performed as part of the musical accompaniment for an original play, Debt the Musical, in British Columbia. In 2011 he produced part of Calum Hughes' album And That's Okay With Me at the Vancouver studio The Warehouse.

Until its disbandment in 2016, Ditrich continued to be the manager for Spirit of the West. By this time he had been suffering from kidney failure for several years, and missed some of the final performances.

Ditrich lived in Vancouver until 1993, but after the birth of his first son, he moved to Vancouver Island and still lives there with his wife, Marion, and their two sons.

Discography

Supertonic (2002)

References

External links
 Vince R. Ditrich: Official site
 Vince Ditrich Profile
 
 

1963 births
Living people
Place of birth missing (living people)
Canadian rock drummers
Canadian male drummers
Canadian folk rock musicians
Musicians from British Columbia
Canadian session musicians
Spirit of the West members
Bachman–Turner Overdrive members